Rodney Falkson (8 November 1941 – 9 August 2019) was a South African cricketer. He played in thirty-three first-class and seven List A matches between 1960 and 1974.

References

External links
 

1941 births
2019 deaths
South African cricketers
KwaZulu-Natal cricketers
Northerns cricketers
Place of birth missing